Eduardo Jardón (3 October 1914 – 20 May 1997) was a Spanish field hockey player. He competed in the men's tournament at the 1948 Summer Olympics.

References

External links
 

1914 births
1997 deaths
Spanish male field hockey players
Olympic field hockey players of Spain
Field hockey players at the 1948 Summer Olympics
Sportspeople from Oviedo